Gazbia Sirry (11 October 1925 – 10 November 2021) was an Egyptian painter.

Born in Cairo, Gazbia Sirry studied fine arts at the Higher Institute of Art Education for Women Teachers in 1950 (currently known as the Faculty of Art Education at Helwan University), where her dissertation traced Egypt's political history. She later became a professor there, and also at the American University in Cairo. She has had more than 50 personal exhibitions, official purchases by international museums, international prizes, scholarships and university chairs. The paintings of Sirry capture the relationship between social reform, feminist consciousness and advocacy of women. Because of their eclecticism and heterogeneity of modern Egypt, Sirry's paintings were widely celebrated.

Her early work was dominated by images of women in unmistakable poses of power, performing roles in the public and private spheres, and celebrating female unity. In the late nineteen fifties, Sirry made stylistic and thematic changes to reflect the grim mood created by discontent with the crackdown on dissent and curtailment of political freedom across the country. It also became increasingly abstract: by the 1960s this shift was apparent. While on fellowship at the Huntington Hartford Foundation in Pacific Palisades, California, 1965, she was introduced to the American style of abstract expressionism; in  interviews Sirry credited this time in her life with “profound impact upon her art practice." Her shift towards abstraction has also been linked some scholars to political unrest and especially the Six-Day War of1967. The full abstraction was replaced in the early 1970s by the reappearance of human forms, but the dark paintings represent the fears of Sirry about the fortunes of women's emancipation. The dominant bright colors and pyramidal shapes of her paintings show the national pride and enthusiasm following the Ramadan/Yom Kippur War of 1973 in the later part of the 1970s.

International recognition
Rome prizes for painting, 1952.
Honoring prize for oil painting from Venice Biennale, 1956.
Second prize for print from Alexandria International Biennale, 1959.
Top prize for painting from Alexandria International Biennale, 1963.
The fourth grand prix of International Contemporary Art, Monaco, 1968.

State collection
Egypt Modern Art Museum, Cairo.
Alexandria Modern Art Museum.
Marine Museum in Alexandria.
The Egyptian National Bank in Cairo.
Al-Ahram newspaper, Cairo.
The Ministry of Foreigners and Egyptian embassies abroad.
The Egyptian Art Academy in Rome.
Arts and Sciences Museum in Evansville, Indiana, USA.
Vincent Price Art Collection in Los Angeles, USA.
Faculties of fine arts and art education in Cairo, Alexandria and Menia.
Josef Museum of Unaligned Countries in Belgrade, Yugoslavia.
Living Art Museum in Tunis.
The Grand Conference Hall at Cairo Opera House and Cairo.
The National Museum of Women Arts in Washington.
Arab World Institute in Paris.
Museum of Art and Sciences in Evansville, Indiana, USA.
Unaligned Countries Museum in Yugoslavia.
The American University in Cairo.
Cairo Opera House.
Great Cairo Library.
Mubarak Public Library in Giza.
The Supreme Council of Culture, Cairo.
Press Syndicate, Cairo.
Novotel Hotel in Cairo Airport.
Sheraton Hotel in Giza.
Sheraton Atoun Hotel in Nuba.

Bibliography
 Atallah, Nadine. "Have there really been no great women artists ? Writing a feminist art history of modern Egypt", in Under the skin : feminist art and art histories from the Middle East and North Africa today, Oxford : Oxford University Press, 2020 (Proceedings of the British Academy), p. 11‑25.
 Atallah, Nadine. "Gazbia Sirry", Dalloul Art Foundation, https://dafbeirut.org/en/gazbia-sirry
 Atallah, Nadine. "Women, Art and the Nation. History of the Exhibitions  of Two Egyptian Women Artists, from the 1950s to the Present day: Inj Efflatoun and Gazbia Sirry", AWARE (Archives of Women Artists Research & Exhibitions), https://awarewomenartists.com/en/magazine/femmes-lart-nation-histoire-expositions-de-deux-artistes-egyptiennes-annees-1950-a-nos-jours-inji-efflatoun-gazbia-sirry/
 Azar, Aimé. Femmes peintres d'Egypte. Le Caire: Imprimerie Française, 1953.
 El-Din, Mursi Saad. Gazbia Sirry: Lust for Color. Cairo: American University in Cairo Press, 1998.
El Razzaz, Mostafa, Sonia Farid, and Ashraf Reda. Inji, Tahia, Gazbia: a life's journey. Cairo: Gallery Picasso, 2014.
Karnouk, Liliane. "Contemporary Egyptian Art", Cairo: American University in Cairo Press, 1995.
Okeke-Agulu, Chika."Politics by Other Means: Two Egyptian Artists, Gazbia Sirry and Ghada Amer."Meridians: feminism, race, transnationalism - Volume 6, Number 2, pp. 117-149.Indiana University Press. 2006.
Seggerman, Alex Dika. Modernism on the Nile: Art in Egypt between the Islamic and the Contemporary. Chapel Hill: UNC Press, 2019. 
Seggerman, Alex Dika. "Gazbia Sirry." Mathaf Encyclopedia, http://encyclopedia.mathaf.org.qa/en/bios/Pages/Gazbia-Sirry.aspx
Winegar, Jessica. Creative Reckonings: The Politics of Art and Culture in Contemporary Egypt. Stanford, California: Stanford University Press, 2006.

References

External links
 
 Egyptian FineArts Governamental Web Site 

1925 births
2021 deaths
Egyptian women painters
Academic staff of Helwan University
Academic staff of The American University in Cairo
20th-century Egyptian painters
20th-century Egyptian educators
20th-century Egyptian women artists
21st-century Egyptian women artists
21st-century Egyptian painters